Justice Roane may refer to:

Archibald Roane, associate justice of the Supreme Court of Tennessee
Spencer Roane, associate justice of the Supreme Court of Virginia